Kwahu Asafo is a town in the Eastern Region of Ghana

Location
Kwahu Asafo is located on the main Accra - Kumasi Highway.

References

See also

Populated places in the Eastern Region (Ghana)